MLB lockout may refer to one of the following lockouts or strike actions in Major League Baseball:
 The 1972 Major League Baseball strike, which canceled 86 games   
 The 1973 Major League Baseball lockout, which cancelled no games
 The 1976 Major League Baseball lockout, which cancelled no games
 The 1980 Major League Baseball strike, which cancelled no games
 The 1981 Major League Baseball strike, which cancelled 713 games
 The 1985 Major League Baseball strike, which cancelled no games
 The 1990 Major League Baseball lockout, which cancelled no games but postponed 1990's opening day to April 9
 The 1994–95 Major League Baseball strike, which cancelled 938 games and the entire 1994 postseason, including the 1994 World Series
 The 2021–22 Major League Baseball lockout, which cancelled no games but postponed 2022's opening day to April 7

See also
MLS lockout
NBA lockout
NFL lockout
NHL lockout

References

Sports labor disputes in the United States
Major League Baseball labor relations
Major League Baseball controversies